ZSL may refer to:

 Zoological Society of London, devoted to the worldwide conservation of animals and their habitats
 Zjednoczone Stronnictwo Ludowe, the United People's Party, a Polish political party 1949–1989
 Zero shutter lag, in photography
 Zambian Sign Language
 Zimbabwean sign languages
 Saudi Professional League, the top football league in Saudi Arabia